The Yanliao Beach Park is a beach in Gongliao District, New Taipei, Taiwan.

Geography
The beach spans up to 80 hectares, making it the largest recreational area in northeast coast of Taiwan. Its golden sand beach stretches 3 km all the way to Fulong Beach, the longest beach stretch in the island. The beach is an ideal place for swimming, fishing, sand sculpture and beach volleyball.

Facilities
The beach has scenery balcony, tour tracks, public restrooms, parking spaces, shower rooms and simple food courts.

Transportation
The beach is accessible by bus from Keelung Station of Taiwan Railways.

See also
 List of tourist attractions in Taiwan

References

Beaches of New Taipei